In enzymology, a 1-methyladenosine nucleosidase is an enzyme that catalyzes the chemical reaction

1-methyladenosine + H2O  1-methyladenine + D-ribose

Thus, the two substrates of this enzyme are 1-methyladenosine and H2O, whereas its two products are 1-methyladenine and D-ribose.

This enzyme belongs to the family of hydrolases, specifically those glycosylases that hydrolyse N-glycosyl compounds.  The systematic name of this enzyme class is 1-methyladenosine ribohydrolase. This enzyme is also called 1-methyladenosine hydrolase.

References

 

EC 3.2.2
Enzymes of unknown structure